Abdul Razzaq al-Mahdi, is a Syrian Islamist cleric who is actively involved fighting in the Syrian Civil War against the Syrian government. He originates from Damascus's Al-Salihiyah district and was born in 1961.

Study and graduation 
He started pursuing Islamic Sciences in 1977 in the al-Fathu’l Islami institution in Damascus, from great scholars of Damascus, most famous among them Abdur Razzaq al-Halabi, the mufti of Hanafis and one who collected mutawatir recitations. He read to him the whole Quran in the narration of Hafs and received an ijazah reaching to Prophet Muhammad. He also studied under Shaykh Adeeb al-Kallas and many other scholars.

He has a great love for hadith sciences and distinguishing them between sahih (authentic) and da'if (weak) since his commence of seeking knowledge. He studied hadith books and terminologies and has read the classical books, the works of later and contemporary scholars. His most eminent teacher is Shaykh Abdul Qader Arnaout, the hadith scholar of al-Sham. He studied under him Qawaid at-Tahdith by al-Qasimi. Frequenting him, he would sit and benefit from him. Shaykh al-Arnaout would praise him, and his sons are said to have a good relationship with him and recommend people to benefit from him.

When al-Mahdi graduated from the Islamic shar’i college, he started working in verifying religious books (tahqiq). He was appointed as an imam and preacher for several mosques in Damascus and its rural areas. He was coerced to pause preaching and studying more than once due to security reasons.

For a short period of time al-Mahdi had left Syria for Tunisia, where he engaged in preaching and teaching activities. After the outbreak of the Syrian Civil War he returned to Syria to support the Opposition fighters in their struggle against the government.

Views and fatwas 
In response to a question in his weekly program "Fatwas from the land of Sham" he discouraged terror attacks targeting civilians stating that it is not permitted to kill non-combatants in Islam. He further hinted at the maleficence of such attacks as they are invoking more apparent reprisal attacks, forging a bad image of Muslims and Islamic fighters and foremost asserting legitimization for the occupation of Muslim countries.

A fatwa allowing abandoned homes to be seized was withdrawn by Abdulrazzaq al Mahdi. A video was posted of Abdul Razzaq al Mahdi pleading for Muslims to intervene against what he called were "cursed Shiite rafidha" in December 2016 during the Battle of Aleppo.

After the death of Muhammad Surur, Abdul Razzaq al-Mahdi released condolences upon him and commented on his impact. Al Mahdi posted a video calling for unity under the leadership of Islamic clerics.

In an article published in the 19th edition of the Turkistan Islamic Party's magazine "Islamic Turkistan", Abdurazak al Mahdi praised Sultan Satuq Bughra Khan's conversion to Islam and Qutayba bin Muslim's conquest.

Abdullah al Muhaysini, Hani al Siba'ee, Abu Qatada, and Abdurazak al Mahdi were all featured in a Turkistan Islamic Party video.

The Turkistan Islamic Party in Syria released "Blessed Are the Strangers #6" featuring a speech by Hasan Mahsum, as well as by Army of Conquest leader Abdullah al-Muhaysini and fellow Abdul Razzaq al Mahdi.

Doğu Türkistan Bülteni Haber Ajansı reported that the Turkistan Islamic Party was praised by Abu Qatada along with Abdul Razzaq al Mahdi, Maqdisi, Muhaysini and Zawahiri.

Abdul Razzaq al-Mahdi and Abdullah al-Muhaysini asked Muslims with money to aid the cause of the Uyghur Turkistan Islamic Party and praised the Uyghur foreign fighters for their role in the Syrian Civil War fighting against the Syrian government.

Muhaysini, Abu Taher Al Hamawi, and Abdelrazzak Mehdi worked on the formation of the group Hay'at Tahrir al-Sham. 
They are members of the group and appeared in its founding declaration. However some months later on 8 March 2017 Abdul Razzaq al-Mahdi announced his split from the group in his official Telegram channel as he had not been able to hinder some injustices and did thus not wish to take share in the responsibility. This came in the wake of the Rebel infighting in South Idlib and Northern Hama between Tahrir al-Sham and Liwa al-Aqsa, an ISIS affiliate left over from the late Jund al-Aqsa movement after its fusion. Liwa al-Aqsa had been accused of harassing other groups and kidnapping people as they considered most groups to be apostates, which emanated from their extreme views in takfir. Since his split from the group al-Mahdi continues his Islamic preaching activities independently and hosts some programs along with answering jurisprudential (relating fiqh - the permissibility or prohibition of actions) questions of his followers online through Telegram.

Abdul Razzaq al-Mahdi along with Nabil Al-Awadi, Tariq Abdelhaleem, and Hani al-Sibai who are linked to Al-Qaeda, in addition to others like Adnan al-Aroor, Abd Al-Aziz Al-Fawzan, Mohamad al-Arefe, Abdul Rahman Al-Sudais, Abdul-Aziz ibn Abdullah Al Shaykh and others were included on a death list by ISIS.

Works 
Activities of the Abdul Razzaq al-Mahdı in revising books were concentrated on the subject of Hadith, particularly the fields of Takhrij (researching variants of the hadith), Tashih (authentifying hadiths) and Tadyif (classifying to be “weak”).

Tafsir 

 Tafsiru’l Qurani’l Azim by Ibn Kathir, 5 volumes
 Tafsiru’l Qurtubi, al-Jami’ li’l-Ahkami’l Quran, 10 volumes
 Tafsiru’sh Shawkani, Fathu’l Qadir; 5 volumes
 Ahkamu’l Quran by Ibn al-Arabi; 4 volumes
 Tafsiru’l Baghawi; 5 volumes
 Tafsiru’l Kashaf by Zamahshari; 5 volumes, including an Appendix
 al-Bahru’l Muhit by Abu Hayyan; 8 volumes
 at-Tashīl by Ibn Juzayy; 2 volumes
 Adwau’l Bayan by al Shanqiti
 Fathul Bayan by Sadiq Hasan Khan

Islamic sciences 

 at-Tamhid by Ibn Abdilbarr
 Fathul Qadir by Ibn Humām; 5 volumes [Hanafi fiqh]
 al-Lubāb; 3 volumes [Hanafi fiqh]
 al-Uddah Sharhul 'Umdah
 ar-Rawdul Murabba’
 Bidāyatul Mujtahid by Ibn Rushd (Averroes)
 al-I’tisam by al-Shātibi
 Fathul Majid
 Shariah by Ajuri
 Tarikhul Madina by Ibn an-Najjar
 Zadul Ma’ad by Ibn Qayyim
 Talbisu Iblis by Ibn Jawzi
 Mukthasar Zadul Ma’ād and Mukhtasar as-Sīrah by Muhammad ibn Abdulwahhab

Miscellaneous 

 Kitabu'l Adhkar by an-Nawawī
 ar-Rihlatu fi talabil hadith by al-Khatīb al-Baghdadi
 al-Khatim by al-Bayhaqī  with an introduction
 Muwatta; 4 volumes revision with a lengthy and detailed takhrij of the hadiths, especially those concerning balaaghah, mursal ones and mawquf hadiths considered marfu' along with a beneficent commentary. It has not been printed later.

References

External links
https://www.facebook.com/almahdi1111/ 
https://ar-ar.facebook.com/almahdi1111/ 
https://m.facebook.com/page/about.php?id=436545373066096
https://twitter.com/ShaykhRazzaq/
http://jihadology.net/category/individuals/ideologues/shaykh-abd-al-razaq-al-mahdi/ 
http://jihadology.net/category/individuals/ideologues/shaykh-abd-al-razaq-al-mahdi/feed/
https://t.me/abdarrazaqm2018

People from Damascus
1961 births
Living people
Syrian Islamists
Syrian Salafis
People of the Syrian civil war
Critics of Shia Islam
Salafi jihadists